Two ships of the United States Navy have been named USS Okinawa, in honor of the Battle of Okinawa.

 The first  was to be an escort carrier, but was cancelled before completion.

Fictional ships
USS Okinawa (NCC-13958) is a starship in the fictional universe of Star Trek.

United States Navy ship names